Manuel Bernardo de Sousa (1 August 1931 - 20 June 2013) was and Angolan diplomat and minister of Transport from 1983 to 1987.

References 

Angolan politicians
Ambassadors of Angola to China
Ambassadors of Angola to Russia
Ambassadors of Angola to Yugoslavia
1931 births
2013 deaths